Frank William John Olver (December 15, 1924 – April 23, 2013) was a professor of mathematics at the Institute for Physical Science and Technology and Department of Mathematics at the University of Maryland who worked on asymptotic analysis, special functions, and numerical analysis. He was the editor in chief of the NIST Digital Library of Mathematical Functions.

Awards

1969• Silver Medal of the US Department of Commerce.

1974• A Fellow of the U.K. Institute of Mathematics and its Applications

1996• A Foreign Member of the Royal Society of Sciences, Uppsala, Sweden

2011• Gold Medal of the US Department of Commerce.

Visiting Fellow, or Professor, at the University of Lancaster, U.K., Imperial College, London University, U.K.,
Cambridge University, U.K., the Royal Irish Academy, and the Australian National University

Publications

See also
 Level-index arithmetic (LI)
 Peter J. Olver (Son of Frank Olver)

References

External links
Frank W. J. Olver, 1924-2013. SIAM News obituary by Roderick Wong
Frank W. J. Olver, mathematician, an obituary in The Washington Post
Home page  of Frank W. J.  Olver

NIST Digital Library of Mathematical Functions

Alumni of the University of London
20th-century American mathematicians
British emigrants to the United States
1924 births
2013 deaths
Members of the Royal Swedish Academy of Sciences
Department of Commerce Gold Medal
University of Maryland, College Park faculty
21st-century American mathematicians